Gonzalo Bonastre Fuster (born 3 March 1981) is a Spanish footballer who plays for Alicante CF as a central defender.

Club career
Player made in the house of Hércules CF. After playing in Spanish Second Division started a journey on the third level teams. Was consecrated as a player in the RSD Alcalá and Ontinyent CF where he was captain.

References

External links
 

1981 births
Living people
Footballers from Alicante
Spanish footballers
Association football central defenders
Hércules CF B players
Hércules CF players
UE Figueres footballers
Algeciras CF footballers
Ontinyent CF players
Alicante CF footballers
Tercera División players
Segunda División B players
Segunda División players
Yeclano Deportivo players
RSD Alcalá players